Uzi Mahnaimi (born in 1952) is an Israeli-born journalist. He is a Middle East correspondent for the London-based The Sunday Times. He is best known for his exclusive stories on the Middle East.

References
Mahnaimi, Uzi and Abu-Sharif, Bassam. Best of Enemies. New York: Little, Brown and Company, 1995.

Israeli journalists
The Sunday Times people
Living people
1952 births
Place of birth missing (living people)
Date of birth missing (living people)